Arvi Tervalampi (3 September 1928 – 16 January 2005) was a Finnish equestrian. He competed in two events at the 1956 Summer Olympics.

References

1928 births
2005 deaths
Finnish male equestrians
Olympic equestrians of Finland
Equestrians at the 1956 Summer Olympics
People from Kem
Finnish emigrants to Sweden